San Damiano is the Italian for Saint Damian. It may also refer to:
Places
 San-Damiano, a commune in the Haute-Corse department of France on the island of Corsica
 San Damiano al Colle, a commune of the Italian Province of Pavia, located among the hills of the Oltrepò Pavese
 San Damiano d'Asti, a commune of the Italian Province of Asti, located in the Alto Monferrato, on the borders with the Langhe and Roero
 San Damiano Macra, a commune of the Italian Province of Cuneo, in the Valle Maira, a valley of the Cottian Alps
 San Damiano (Brugherio), a frazione of Brugherio in the Italian Province of Monza and Brianza, Lombardy
Other
 San Damiano, Assisi, a church and monastery in the Italian region of Umbria associated with Saints Clare and Francis
 The San Damiano cross, a large Romanesque rood cross associated with Saint Francis of Assisi which presently hangs in the Basilica of Saint Clare in Assisi

See also
Damiano (disambiguation)